The 2015–16 Håndboldligaen (known as the Boxer Herreligaen for sponsorship reasons) is the 80th season of the Håndboldligaen, Denmark's premier Handball league.

Team information 

The following 14 clubs compete in the Håndboldligaen during the 2015–16 season:

Personnel and kits
Following is the list of clubs competing in 2015–16 Håndboldligaen, with their manager, kit manufacturer and shirt sponsor.

Regular season

Standings

! There's a new relegation playoff made in November 2014

Schedule and results

No. 1-8 from the regular season divided into two groups with the top two will advance to the semifinals

Top Goalscorers - Regular Season

Winner's playoff

Group 1

Group 2

Playoff

Semifinal

3rd place

Final

Relegation playoff
No. 12-13 from Håndboldligaen and no. 2-3 from the first division is meet each other for the last 2 seats. The winner stays in the league. the loser relegated to Division 1,

Group 1

Group 2

Number of teams by regions

All Star Team
Goalkeeper:  Kasper Hvidt (KIF)
Left Wing:  Magnus Landin Jacobsen (KIF)
Left Back:  Bo Spellerberg (KIF)
Centre Back:  Sander Sagosen (AAL)
Pivot:  Bjarte Myrhol (SKJ)
Right Back:  Kasper Søndergaard (SKJ)
Right Wing:  Patrick Wiesmach Larsen (TTH)

Top goalscorers

References

External links
 Danish Handball Federaration 

2015–16 domestic handball leagues
Handboldligaen
Handball competitions in Denmark
2016 in Danish sport